Dolné Semerovce is a village and municipality in the Levice District in the Nitra Region of Slovakia.

History

In historical records the village was first mentioned in 1268.

Geography
The village lies at an altitude of 174 metres and covers an area of 11.861 km². It has a population of about 500 people.

Ethnicity
The village is approximately 60% Magyar, 20% Slovak and 20% Gypsy in ethnicity.

Facilities
The village has a public library and a football pitch.

Genealogical resources

The records for genealogical research are available at the state archive "Statny Archiv in Banska Bystrica, Nitra, Slovakia"

 Roman Catholic church records (births/marriages/deaths): 1703-1896 (parish A)
 Lutheran church records (births/marriages/deaths): 1721-1900 (parish B)

See also
 List of municipalities and towns in Slovakia

External links
https://web.archive.org/web/20071116010355/http://www.statistics.sk/mosmis/eng/run.html
Surnames of living people in Dolne Semerovce

Villages and municipalities in Levice District